Rachis is a genus of air-breathing land snails, terrestrial pulmonate gastropod mollusks in the family Cerastidae.

This genus is also spelled as “Rhachis”as a synonym. Rachis is a Latinised version of rhachis (a midrib or ridge) or rhachos (a thorn or thorn bush), both of which are Greek nouns of feminine gender.

Species
 Rachis ambongoensis Fischer-Piette, 1964
 Rachis aurea (Heude, 1890)
 Rachis badiola (Morelet, 1881)
 Rachis bewsheri (Morelet, 1877)
 Rachis catenata (E. von Martens, 1860)
 Rachis comorensis (Morelet, 1881)
 Rachis cunctatoris van Bruggen, 1975
 Rachis electrina (Morelet, 1864)
 Rachis elongatula Bourguignat, 1890
 Rachis fagotiana (Ancey, 1885)
 Rachis genalensis Kobelt, 1910
 Rachis gracillima F. Haas, 1936
 Rachis humbloti (Morelet, 1888) (accepted > unreplaced junior homonym)
 Rachis ingenua (Morelet, 1864)
Rachis jejuna (Melvill & Ponsonby, 1893)
 Rachis nigrilineata (Reeve, 1849)
 Rachis obeliscus C. R. Boettger, 1913
 Rachis pachistoma Bourguignat, 1890
Rachis punctata (Anton, 1838)
 Rachis stahlbergi C. R. Boettger, 1913
Rachis tulearensis Fischer-Piette, 1964
 Rachis venusta (Morelet, 1861)
 Rachis zonulata (L. Pfeiffer, 1846)
Synonyms
 Rachis aldabrae (E. von Martens, 1898): synonym of Rhachistia aldabrae (E. von Martens, 1898) (unaccepted combination)
 Rachis badiolus: synonym of Rachis badiola (Morelet, 1881) (incorrect grammatical agreement of specific epithet)
 Rachis bidwilli (Cox, 1868): synonym of Rhachistia histrio (L. Pfeiffer, 1855)
 Rachis bloyeti Bourguignat, 1890: synonym of Rhachidina braunsii (E. von Martens, 1869): synonym of Rhachistia braunsii (E. von Martens, 1869) (junior synonym)
 Rachis boehmi (E. von Martens, 1895): synonym of Rhachistia boehmi (E. von Martens, 1895)
 Rachis braunsii (E. von Martens, 1869): synonym of Rhachistia braunsii (E. von Martens, 1869) (superseded combination)
 Rachis burnayi (Dohrn, 1866): synonym of Gittenedouardia burnayi (Dohrn, 1866)
 Rachis burtoi (Bourguignat, 1890): synonym of Rachis punctata (Anton, 1838) (junior synonym)
 Rachis chalcedonica (Gredler, 1887): synonym of Mirus chalcedonicus (Gredler, 1887) (unaccepted combination)
 Rachis dohrni (Greeff, 1882): synonym of Aporachis dohrni (Greeff, 1882)
 Rachis eminula (Morelet, 1848): synonym of Gittenedouardia eminula (Morelet, 1848)
 Rachis erlangeri Kobelt, 1910: synonym of Rhachistia erlangeri (Kobelt, 1910) (unaccepted combination)
 Rachis fagotianus: synonym of Rachis fagotiana (Ancey, 1885) (incorrect grammatical agreement of specific epithet)
 Rachis hieroglyphicus Preston, 1910: synonym of Rachis hieroglyphica Preston, 1910 (incorrect grammatical agreement of specific epithet)
 Rachis hispida (Greeff, 1882): synonym of Aporachis hispida (Greeff, 1882)
 Rachis ingenuus: synonym of Rachis ingenua (Morelet, 1864) (incorrect grammatical agreement of specific epithet)
 Rachis jouberti Bourguignat, 1890: synonym of Rhachidina braunsii var. succincta (E. von Martens, 1879): synonym of Rhachistia braunsii (E. von Martens, 1869)
 Rachis libbahensis (Tomlin, 1910): synonym of Zebrinops libbahensis (Tomlin, 1910)
 Rachis moluensis Kobelt, 1910: synonym of Rhachistia moluensis (Kobelt, 1910)
 Rachis nigrilineatus (Reeve, 1849): synonym of Rachis nigrilineata (Reeve, 1849) (incorrect grammatical agreement of specific epithet)
 Rachis onychinus (Heude, 1885): synonym of Sinorachis onychinus (Heude, 1885) (unaccepted combination
Rachis petersi (Pfeiffer, 1855):<ref name=III>Pfeiffer, L. (1855). Description of thirty-eight new species of Helicea, from the collection of H. Cuming, Esq. Proceedings of the Zoological Society of London, 23, 91–101.</ref> synonym of Pleurorhachis petersi (L. Pfeiffer, 1855) (superseded combination)
 Rachis punctatus (Anton, 1838): synonym of Rachis punctata (Anton, 1838) (incorrect grammatical agreement of specific epithet)
 Rachis rorkorensis Kobelt, 1910: synonym of Rhachistia rorkorensis (Kobelt, 1910)
 Rachis succincta (E. von Martens, 1879): synonym of Rhachistia braunsii (E. von Martens, 1869) (junior synonym)
 Rachis turricula Preston, 1911: synonym of Gittenedouardia turricula (Preston, 1911) (original combination)
 Rachis venustus (Morelet, 1861): synonym of Rachis venusta (Morelet, 1861) (incorrect grammatical agreement of specific epithet)
 Rachis vesiculatus (Benson, 1859): synonym of Rhachistia vesiculata (Benson, 1859) (incorrect grammatical agreement of specific epithet)
 Rachis vicinus Preston, 1910: synonym of Rhachistia chiradzuluensis (E.A. Smith, 1899) (junior synonym)
 Rachis virginea Preston, 1911: synonym of Rhachistia chiradzuluensis var. virginea'' (Preston, 1911) (original combination)

References

 Bank, R. A. (2017). Classification of the Recent terrestrial Gastropoda of the World. Last update: July 16, 2017

External links
 Albers, J. C. (1850). Die Heliceen nach natürlicher Verwandtschaft systematisch geordnet. Berlin: Enslin. 262 pp.
 Bourguignat, J.-R. (1890). Mollusques de l'Afrique équatoriale de Moguedouchou à Bagamoyo et de Bagamoyo au Tanganika. 1-229, pls 1-8. Book dated 1889, publication date 1890

Gastropod genera
Molluscs of Africa
 
Cerastidae